The Taichung City Council (TCCC) is the elected municipal council of Taichung City, Republic of China. The council composes of 63 councilors lastly elected through the 2018 Republic of China local election on 24 November 2018.

History

Taichung City Council was officially formed on 25 December 2010 after the merging between Taichung City and Taichung County to form the Taichung municipality.

Organization
 Speaker
 Deputy Speaker
 Secretary-General
 Deputy Secretary-General
 Secretary
 Secretarial Office
 Procedure Section
 General Affairs Section
 Public Relations Section
 Administration Office
 Legal Affairs Office
 Document Archives and Information Management Office
 Personnel Office
 Accounting Office
 Civil Affairs Committee
 Finance and Economic Committee
 Education and Culture Committee
 Transportation and Land Administration Committee
 Police, Fire and Environmental Sanitation Committee
 Urban Development, Construction and Water Resources Committee
 Legislation Committee

See also
 Taichung City Government

References

External links